The National Council on Compensation Insurance (NCCI) is a U.S. insurance rating and data collection bureau specializing in workers' compensation. Operating with a not-for-profit philosophy and owned by its member insurers, NCCI annually collects data covering more than four million workers compensation claims and two million policies. The bureau uses this information to provide:

 Analysis of industry trends in workers' compensation costs
 Workers compensation insurance rate and loss cost recommendations
 Cost analysis of proposed legislation regarding workers' compensation regulations and benefits
 Special claims research projects
 Analysis of judicial and regulatory decisions on workers' compensation
 Cooperation with other data-collection agencies to ensure a credible database

NCCI also produces a number of manuals that govern the details of how Workers Compensation insurance premiums are calculated in many (but not all) states.  Among these manuals are the Basic Manual (which sets out rules on the classification code system, payroll amounts used to compute premiums, and changes in classifications and premiums); Experience Rating Manual (which details rules governing how Experience Modification Factors are computed and used in Workers Compensation insurance premiums); and the Scopes Manual (which details how NCCI intends the various classification codes to be assigned to various kinds of employment).

NCCI also computes the experience modification factors used in most states to adjust employers' Workers Compensation insurance premiums, using loss and payroll data reported by the various member insurance companies that are part of NCCI.

NCCI provides data and analysis to insurance companies, state workers' compensation insurance funds, regulatory authorities, employers needing information on workers' compensation issues, and non-governmental workers' compensation agencies. The bureau is headquartered in Boca Raton, Florida with regional offices throughout the United States. The current president and CEO is William Donnell. A board of directors composed of representatives of affiliated insurers and outside organizations oversees the bureau's activities.

External links
 NCCI website
Online Guide to Workers Compensation Insurance

Insurance in the United States
Workers' compensation